Morula coronata is a species of sea snail, a marine gastropod mollusk in the family Muricidae, the murex snails or rock snails.

Description
The sea snail was described by Henry Adams in 1869 after locating it on Barkly Island, Mauritius. It was originally named Coralliophila coronata.

Distribution

References

 Houart R., Kilburn R.N. & Marais A.P. (2010) Muricidae. pp.176–270, in: Marais A.P. & Seccombe A.D. (eds), Identification guide to the seashells of South Africa. Volume 1. Groenkloof: Centre for Molluscan Studies. 376 pp.

coronata
Gastropods described in 1869